Tavaeruaiti is one of 22 islands in the Aitutaki atoll of the Cook Islands. It is located on the eastern perimeter of Aitutaki Lagoon to the north of the larger island of Tavaerua (Tavaeruaiti means "Little Tavaerua"), four kilometres to the east of the main island of Aitutaki. The island is 250m long and 210m wide.

References

Islands of Aitutaki